Davor Ivo Stier (born 6 January 1972) is a Croatian-Argentine politician and diplomat. He was a member of the Croatian Parliament in 2011–2013, a member of the European Parliament in 2013–2016, as well as the 13th Minister of Foreign and European Affairs of Croatia in 2016–2017.

Family and studies 

Stier was born in Buenos Aires, Argentina and lived in the middle-class Flores district (the same of Pope Francis) in a Croatian expatriate family originating from Samobor.  His paternal grandfather Ivan Stier was an Ustaše colonel and assistant to Vjekoslav Luburić who escaped to South America after World War II. His maternal grandfather, Milorad Lukač, was one of the leading emigrant politicians of the Croatian Peasant Party. Stier's father was a doctor and his mother Marija Lukač was a university professor.

Stier came to Croatia for the first time in 1990 at 18 as part of the Croatian Heritage Foundation program, and for the second time three weeks before the fall of Vukovar as a journalist for the Argentine newspaper El Cronista and Radio America. He returned to Argentina in February 1992, where he graduated in Political Science and International Relations at the Pontifical Catholic University of Argentina, and later on in journalism.

Political career 

Stier returned to Croatia in 1996 at the invitation of the Ministry of Foreign Affairs, after which he worked in the Croatian embassies in Washington and Brussels, and by 2009 was foreign policy adviser to Prime Minister Ivo Sanader.

At the 2011 parliamentary elections, Stier was elected a member of the Croatian Parliament. He became a member of the Interparliamentary Cooperation Committee and the Committee for European Integration, and was appointed Vice-Chairman of the Foreign Policy Committee. He was also nominated a member of the Croatian Parliament delegation at the NATO Parliamentary Assembly and the Croatian Parliament delegation at the Joint Parliamentary Committee of the Republic of Croatia.

Stier was one of the closest associates of Jadranka Kosor and her adviser and delegate for Euro-Atlantic cooperation. During the Slovenian-Croatian diplomatic freeze, Stier was the main participant in the behind-the scenes diplomacy effort and mediator between Kosor and the Slovenian Prime Minister Borut Pahor. In the May 2012 HDZ leadership contest, Stier supported Tomislav Karamarko but was later opposed to the disciplinary proceedings against Jadranka Kosor in February 2013, after the party decided to sanction her because of her appearances in the media.

In September 2012, Stier asked the Croatian government to desist from ratification of the state border dispute between Croatia and Bosnia and Herzegovina, claiming that in so doing Croatia would have agreed to participate in blackmail politics and linked European Union membership to border issues. He accused Bosnia and Herzegovina's Transport Minister Damir Hadzic of blackmailing the Croatian government by stating that Bosnia and Herzegovina would not allow the construction of the Peljesac bridge unless Croatia ratified the border agreement.

In April 2013, Stier said that the prerequisite for Bosnia and Herzegovina to enter the European Union would be the institutional equality of Croats in Bosnia and Herzegovina.

Two months later, in June, Stier stated that "Croatia must strongly take up the issue of the constituency of the Croatian people in Bosnia and Herzegovina not only on paper but also in practice." He estimated that the Federation of Bosnia and Herzegovina was "a de facto Bosniak entity" and announced the possibility of Bosnia and Herzegovina being reformed according to the Belgian model. He also said that Croatia would use Croatia's accession to the European Union to resolve the Croat issue in Bosnia and Herzegovina.

Following Croatia's EU accession, in the  first elections to the European Parliament in Croatia in April 2013, Stier won 14 005 votes on the list of the HDZ coalition that was composed of HSP AS and BUZ. With 5.75% of votes cast, he became one of the first Members of the European Parliament from Croatia.
At the session of the European Parliament's Foreign Policy Committee in July 2013, Stier requested that the European Union more strongly support the right of the Croatian people in BiH to equality with other constituent peoples and thus internationalized the "Croatian issue" in BiH. In an interview forVečernji list in the same month, Stier stated that Croats in BiH are an indispensable and decisive factor in the Europeanization of Bosnia and Herzegovina, while the role of the European Union in Bosnia and Herzegovina is crucial and that cooperation with Russia and Turkey is welcome.

In the second election for the European Parliament in Croatia in May 2014, Stier again won a 26,432-vote mandate as a candidate on the list of HDZ's coalition composed of HSS, HSP AS, BUZ, ZDS and HDS.

In 2015, Stier published the book A New Croatian Paradigm: an Essay on Social Integration and Development (Nova hrvatska paradigma: ogled o društvenoj integraciji i razvoju)

Stier was Deputy Prime Minister of Croatia and the 13th Minister of Foreign and European Affairs in the Cabinet of Andrej Plenković from 19 October 2016 until his resignation on 19 June 2017. He left the cabinet after the collapse of the HDZ-Most coalition and the new coalition with the liberal HNS party.

Personal life

Stier lives in Samobor with his wife and three children.

See also
List of foreign ministers in 2017

References

External links

|-

1972 births
Argentine people of Croatian descent
Argentine emigrants to Croatia
Croatian Democratic Union MEPs
Croatian diplomats
Foreign ministers of Croatia
Living people
MEPs for Croatia 2013–2014
MEPs for Croatia 2014–2019
Politicians from Buenos Aires
Representatives in the modern Croatian Parliament